William Edwardes, 2nd Baron Kensington (24 April 1777 – 10 August 1852), styled The Honourable William Edwardes until 1801, was a British peer and Member of Parliament. He was the instigator of the infamous Kensington Canal.

Kensington was the son of William Edwardes, 1st Baron Kensington, who represented Haverfordwest in the House of Commons for over 50 years, and Elizabeth Warren. He was commander of the Cambrian Rangers a fencible regiment stationed in Gibraltar in 1801 

He succeeded his father as second Baron Kensington in 1801 but as this was an Irish peerage it did not entitle him to an automatic seat in the House of Lords. He was instead elected to succeed his father as Member of Parliament for Haverfordwest in 1802, a seat he held until 1818. Haverfordwest was considered a pocket borough of the Picton Castle estate and both Kensington and his father held the seat as part of an arrangement with Lord Milford, the owner of the estate and Lord Lieutenant of Pembrokeshire. He belonged to the Whig Party.

In 1831, he was a prominent supporter of the Reform Bill.

Lord Kensington married Dorothy Patricia Thomas, daughter of Richard Thomas, in 1797; they had six sons and two daughters. He died in August 1852, aged 75, and Edwardes Square, London W8 is named in his honour. He was succeeded in the barony by his son William. Another son, George Warren Edwardes (1802–1879), joined the army and then the colonial service. London and Edinburgh Gazette entries record his early career: he joined the 17th Dragoons as a Cornet by purchase in 1824,  transferred to be a Cornet and Sub-Lieutenant in 2nd Life Guards in the same year, and had risen to Captain in 32nd Foot by 1828. In 1836 he went on half-pay in the 14th Foot until transferring to the 72nd Foot in 1840. He was appointed Colonial Auditor at St Helena in 1845 and was still there whenhis father died. In 1856 he beacame Governor of Labuan. He was a "bitter enemy of the Brookes...deeply jealous of Sarawak" (the adjacent British-ruled, albeit independent, power). , which led to his being relieved of his position as Consul-General to Brunei, and his Governorship terminated, in 1861 after he had incurred British government displeasure for his use of the HEIC steamer Victoria to travel to Muka and threaten to fire a broadside at Sarawak forces unless they ceased their activities against Sherip Masahor. Never married,he died at Chandos House London on 21 February, 1879 and was buried in Kent.

References

Kidd, Charles, Williamson, David (editors). Debrett's Peerage and Baronetage (1990 edition). New York: St Martin's Press, 1990.

Sources

1777 births
1852 deaths
Barons in the Peerage of Ireland
UK MPs 1802–1806
UK MPs 1806–1807
UK MPs 1807–1812
UK MPs 1812–1818
UK MPs who inherited peerages
Whig (British political party) MPs for Welsh constituencies
Lords of the Admiralty